Rhymney is a town and a community in the county borough of Caerphilly, South Wales. It is within the historic boundaries of Monmouthshire. With the villages of Pontlottyn, Fochriw, Abertysswg, Deri and New Tredegar, Rhymney is designated as the 'Upper Rhymney Valley' by the local Unitary Authority, Caerphilly County Borough Council. As a community, Rhymney includes the town of Rhymney, Pontlottyn, Abertysswg, Butetown and Twyncarno.

Rhymney is known to many outside Wales as a result of the song "The Bells of Rhymney", a musical adaptation of a poem by Idris Davies.

Etymology 
The town is named after the Rhymney River, whose name derives from the Welsh word  "auger" + , a derivational noun ending.

History
The countryside around present day Rhymney would have been very different in the early 17th century. A new parish of Bedwellty had been formed in 1624, covering the lower division of the Wentloog Hundred, in the county of Monmouth, a hilly district between the river Rumney, on the West, and the Sirhowey on the East. The upper Sirhowy Valley at this time would have been a natural well wooded valley, consisting of a few farms and the occasional small iron works where iron ore and coal naturally had occurred together. Later it would have contained the chapelries of Rhymney and Tredegar, the latter being known as a market town. It was not until the 1750s that industrialisation began with the establishment of the Sirhowy Iron Works.  

The town was founded with the establishment of the Union ironworks in 1801, with the Rhymney Iron Company later being founded from a merger between the Bute and Union Ironworks in 1837.  The ironworks  used local coking coal, iron ore and limestone. From the mid-19th century, steam coal pits were sunk to the south of the town.  The ironworks closed in 1891 and by the early 20th century the town's collieries employed nearly the entire local population.

The parish church of Rhymney is a Grade II listed building that was constructed in the neo-classical style. It was built by architect Philip Hardwick from London on commission for Andrew Buchan who was the manager of the local Rhymney brewery between 1838–1858. The building was listed in 1990 and was noted for being one of the most 'interesting' examples of neoclassical architecture in South Wales. Buchan himself is buried in the parish church vaults and is commemorated with a plaque in the nave of the church. The parish is occasionally visited by enthusiasts of Hardwick's work who are interested in neo-classical buildings of this type.

The history of Rhymney is described in Rhymney Memories, a book by Dr Thomas Jones.  Jones was born in the town and his daughter, the Labour Party politician Eirene White, was later granted the title Baroness White of Rhymney.

Education and transport
The town's secondary school, Idris Davies School, serves a catchment area that includes Fochriw, Pontlottyn and New Tredegar. There is also a Welsh language primary school in Rhymney.

In 1999, Ystrad Mynach College launched its sister campus in Rhymney to serve the top end of the Rhymney Valley under the name The College Rhymney. The College Rhymey underwent rapid growth after its opening, with over 700 students enrolling on various courses in the 2007–2008 academic year. The College Rhymey is now permanently closed.

Rhymney railway station is on the Rhymney Line. Featured on the Rhymney Line is a viaduct that was built by the Rhymney Railway company to facilitate the line in 1857 after the incorporation of the company to build the line to the steel works in 1854. The viaduct which opened in 1858 was designed by English engineer Joseph Cubitt.(1811–1872).

Notable people and organisations
See also :Category:People from Rhymney

The celebrated Welsh poet Idris Davies (1905–1953) was born in Rhymney.  After leaving school at the age of 14 he worked as a miner in the nearby Abertysswg and Rhymney Mardy Pits.  After participating in the failed General Strike of 1926, Davies moved to London where he worked as a teacher at various schools.  Four volumes of his poetry were published during his lifetime: Gwalia Deserta (1938), The Angry Summer: A Poem of 1926 (1943), Tonypandy and other poems (1945), and Selected Poems (1953).  He returned to Rhymney in 1947 and died of cancer on 6 April 1953.

General manager and engineer of the Rhymney Railway Cornelius Lundie (1815–1908).  For over 40 years, he was, a few years prior to his death, appointed consulting director to the Company, and actively discharged the duties of that office until the very end. As an engineer he designed and constructed many extensions of the system and widenings of the main line, including a double-way tunnel under the Cefn On or Caerphilly mountain, and a masonry viaduct of seven spans over the River Taff, besides new locomotive shops at Caerphilly, and other works. He was 93 when he died in 1908 and is thought to be the oldest railway director of his time.

The professor, civil servant, administrator, and author Dr Thomas Jones CH (1870–1955) was also born in Rhymney.  After leaving school at 14 he became a clerk at the Rhymney Iron and Steel Works.  He was admitted to the University College of Wales, Aberystwyth in 1890 and later migrated to Glasgow University in 1890.  Between 1904 and 1905 he lectured in Ireland and upon returning to Wales in 1910 became Secretary of the Welsh National Campaign against Tuberculosis.  He was appointed Secretary of the National Health Insurance Commission (Wales) in 1912 and transferred to London in 1916 as Assistant Secretary to the Cabinet, eventually becoming Deputy Secretary.  He suffered a serious fall indoors at his home in Kent in June 1955 and died in a private nursing home on 15 October 1955.

Notable people born in Rhymney include the Major League Baseball trainer John D. Reese, Wales international rugby union Wing Tom James, and Professor W. John Morgan, Commonwealth Scholarship Commissioner, and Chair of the United Kingdom National Commission for UNESCO.https://www.ukwhoswho.com/

One of the largest employers in Rhymney is Williams Medical Supplies Ltd.

The town is home to the Rhymney Silurian Male Choir, which was formed in 1951 to renew the tradition of male voice singing in Rhymney.  During its history, the choir has won four National Eisteddfod titles and raised money for a number of charities.

"The Bells of Rhymney"

Rhymney is known to many outside Wales due to folk singer Pete Seeger's song "The Bells of Rhymney".  The lyrics to the song are drawn from a poem by Idris Davies, and the poem was first published in Davies' 1938 anthology Gwalia Deserta.  The poem was inspired by the failure of the 1926 General Strike and by the Marine Colliery disaster of 1 March 1927.  In addition to Rhymney, the poem also refers to the bells of Merthyr, Rhondda, Blaina, Caerphilly, Neath, Brecon, Swansea, Newport, Cardiff and the Wye Valley.

The song has been covered by a number of acts over the years, including Judy Collins, Cher, the Alarm, the Ian Campbell Folk Group, John Denver, Robyn Hitchcock, Oysterband and Ralph McTell.  Arguably the most widely known rendition of the song, however, was that recorded by the American band the Byrds for their 1965 album Mr. Tambourine Man.

See also

 Redwood Memorial Hospital

References

Bibliography
 
 
 
 
 
 
 
Jones,Thomas, 1990, Rhymney Memories, The National Library of Wales, Aberystwyth, .
 Morris, Eben (Ed.),1990, Fe'm Ganed i yn Rhymni|I Was Born in Rhymney, Cyfrol Deyrnged i Idris Davies|The Idris Davies Memorial Volume, Gwasg Gomer|Gomer Press, LLandyssul, Dyfed. (HB) -4 (SB).

External links

 The College Rhymney
 Rhymney Comprehensive School
 Lyrics to the song "The Bells of Rhymney"

Towns in Caerphilly County Borough
Communities in Caerphilly County Borough